In mathematics, an η set (Eta set) is a type of totally ordered set introduced by  that generalizes the order type η of the rational numbers.

Definition

Examples

The only non-empty countable η0 set (up to isomorphism) is the ordered set of rational numbers.

Suppose that κ=ℵα is a regular cardinal and let X be the set of all functions f from κ to {−1,0,1} such that if f(α) = 0 then f(β) = 0 for all β>α, ordered lexicographically. Then X is a ηα set. The union of all these sets is the class of surreal numbers.

A dense totally ordered set without endpoints is a ηα set if and only if it is ℵα saturated.

Properties

Any ηα set X is universal for totally ordered sets of cardinality at most ℵα, meaning that any such set can be embedded into X.

For any given ordinal α, any two ηα sets of cardinality  ℵα are isomorphic (as ordered sets). An ηα set of cardinality  ℵα exists if ℵα is regular and Σβ<α 2ℵβ ≤ ℵα.

References

 English translation in 

Order theory